An alcohol monopoly is a government monopoly on manufacturing and/or retailing of some or all alcoholic beverages, such as beer, wine and spirits. It can be used as an alternative for total prohibition of alcohol. They exist in all Nordic countries except Denmark proper (only on the Faroe Islands), and in all provinces and territories in Canada except Alberta (which privatised its monopoly in 1993). In the United States, there are some alcoholic beverage control states, where alcohol wholesale is controlled by a state government operation and retail sales are offered by either state or private retailers. 

An alcohol monopoly also existed in Taiwan between 1947 and 2002, which uniquely, did not actually serve as a form of reducing alcohol use, as was the case in the Nordic countries, Canada and the U.S., but was simply a continuation of the system established during Japanese rule of Taiwan. The Taiwanese market was gradually opened to overseas brands starting from 1987, with full liberalisation in 2002, the year when Taiwan was admitted to the WTO.

History 
The alcohol monopoly was created in the Swedish town of Falun in 1850, to prevent overconsumption and reduce the profit motive for sales of alcohol. It later went all over the country in 1905 when the Swedish parliament ordered all sales of vodka to be done via local alcohol monopolies. In 1895, Russia established a state monopoly on alcohol, which became a major source of revenue for the Russian government.

Following the prohibition of alcohol in Norway in 1919, the wine-producing nations demanded a reflexive policy regarding the goods exported from Norway, and Vinmonopolet was established in 1922, as a response to a deal with France, which allowed Norwegians to buy as much table wine of any kind as they wanted. When prohibition was lifted on fortified wine in 1923 and spirits in 1926, Vinmonopolet assumed sales of these goods as well.

Unlike most of its Nordic neighbours, Denmark proper never had any period of alcohol prohibition or any state-owned alcohol monopoly, giving rise to its relatively liberal alcohol laws and drinking culture, however, the Faroe Islands, a constituent country of the Kingdom of Denmark, enacted alcohol prohibition in 1908 following a referendum held the previous year. Faroese people were however allowed to import very limited quantities of alcohol from Denmark proper for personal consumption after 1928, and after a referendum to lift prohibition in the Faroe Islands failed in 1973, the Faroe Islands finally lifted alcohol prohibition in 1992 with the establishment of the Rúsdrekkasøla Landsins alcohol monopoly that same year.

The Taiwan Tobacco and Liquor Corporation is the modern-day descendant of a government agency originally established during Japanese rule in 1901 which was responsible for all liquor and tobacco products in Taiwan as well as opium, salt, and camphor. In 1922, the agency began selling Takasago Beer through the Takasago Malted Beer Company, which was subsequently renamed as Taiwan Beer in 1946. After the end of World War II in 1945, the incoming Kuomintang preserved the monopoly system for alcohol and tobacco, and assigned the production of beer to the Taiwan Provincial Monopoly Bureau, which was renamed as Taiwan Tobacco and Wine Monopoly Bureau the following year. The Bureau exercised a monopoly on all alcohol and tobacco products sold in Taiwan until liberalisation of the Taiwanese alcohol market between 1987 and 2002, after which it was succeeded by the state-owned Taiwan Tobacco and Liquor Corporation which competes with many overseas brands today.

The Tamil Nadu State Marketing Corporation (TASMAC) is a company owned by the Government of Tamil Nadu, which has a monopoly over wholesale and retail vending of alcoholic beverages in the Indian state of Tamil Nadu. It controls the Indian-made foreign liquor (IMFL) trade in the state. A similar function is also performed by Kerala State Beverages Corporation (BEVCO) within the Indian state of Kerala.

Examples

Canada
Provincial Liquor Crown Companies — Canada
BC Liquor Distribution Branch — British Columbia
Manitoba Liquor & Lotteries Corporation — Manitoba
New Brunswick Liquor Corporation — New Brunswick
Newfoundland and Labrador Liquor Corporation — Newfoundland and Labrador
Northwest Territories Liquor Commission — Northwest Territories
Nova Scotia Liquor Corporation — Nova Scotia
Nunavut Liquor and Cannabis Commission — Nunavut
Liquor Control Board of Ontario — Ontario
Prince Edward Island Liquor Control Commission — Prince Edward Island
Société des alcools du Québec — Quebec
Saskatchewan Liquor and Gaming Authority  — Saskatchewan
Yukon Liquor Corporation — Yukon

India
Kerala State Beverages Corporation – Kerala, India
TASMAC — Tamil Nadu, India

Middle East

Qatar Distribution Company – Qatar
Tekel — Turkey

Nordic countries
All Nordic countries except Denmark have a government monopoly on the sale of strong alcohol.
Rúsdrekkasøla Landsins – Faroe Islands (1992–)
Alko – Finland (1932–)
Vínbúðin – Iceland (1961–)
Vinmonopolet – Norway (1922–)
Systembolaget – Sweden (1955–)

United States

National Alcohol Beverage Control Association — United States
North Carolina Alcoholic Beverage Control Commission
Pennsylvania Liquor Control Board — Pennsylvania
Virginia Department of Alcoholic Beverage Control
Maryland Alcohol Beverage Control

See also
Alcoholic beverages in Sweden
Temperance movement

Further reading
Graham Butler "Alcoholic Goods and Sweden: The EU Law of Private Imports, Retail Sale, and State Monopolies". Stockholm: Swedish Institute for European Policy Studies, 2022. .

References